Lewis Summers (November 7, 1778  – August 27, 1843) was a nineteenth-century American politician from Virginia and Ohio.

Early life
Summers was born in Fairfax County, Virginia and was educated in Alexandria.

Career

As an adult, Summers lived for several years in Alexandria, Virginia and held the office of Marshall there for several years.

On moving to Ohio in 1808, he served in both houses of the Ohio State Legislature over a stay of six years there.

In 1814, Summers returned to Virginia, settling in Kanawha County. There he served in the Virginia Assembly in 1817-1818, before being appointed to the Virginia General Court in 1819. He later served as a judge on the Kanawha Circuit Court until his death.

In 1829, Summers was elected to the Virginia Constitutional Convention of 1829-1830. He was elected by the Convention to serve on the Committee on the Legislative Department. He was one of four delegates elected from the western senatorial district made up his home district of Cabell, and Kanawha, Mason, Randolph, Harrison, Lewis, Wood and Logan Counties.

Summers also served on the Virginia Board of Public Works for some years, seeking to expand the state’s internal improvements.

Death
Lewis Summers died on August 27, 1843 in Greenbrier, West Virginia, White Sulphur Springs. He is buried at Walnut Grove, his county seat.

References

Bibliography

Members of the Virginia House of Delegates
1778 births
1843 deaths
Members of the Ohio House of Representatives
Ohio state senators
People from Fairfax County, Virginia
People from Alexandria, Virginia